In enzymology, a 8-amino-7-oxononanoate synthase is an enzyme that catalyzes the chemical reaction

6-carboxyhexanoyl-CoA + L-alanine  8-amino-7-oxononanoate + CoA + CO2

Thus, the two substrates of this enzyme are 6-carboxyhexanoyl-CoA and L-alanine, whereas its 3 products are 8-amino-7-oxononanoate, CoA, and CO2.

This enzyme participates in biotin metabolism.  It employs one cofactor, pyridoxal phosphate.

Nomenclature 

This enzyme belongs to the family of transferases, specifically those acyltransferases transferring groups other than aminoacyl groups.  The systematic name of this enzyme class is 6-carboxyhexanoyl-CoA:L-alanine C-carboxyhexanoyltransferase (decarboxylating). Other names in common use include 7-keto-8-aminopelargonic acid synthetase, 7-keto-8-aminopelargonic synthetase, and 8-amino-7-oxopelargonate synthase.

References

Further reading 

 
 
 
 

EC 2.3.1
Pyridoxal phosphate enzymes
Enzymes of known structure